These Thousand Hills is a 1959 American Western film directed by Richard Fleischer and starring Don Murray, Richard Egan, Lee Remick, Stuart Whitman and Patricia Owens. The screenplay was written by Alfred Hayes. It is based on the novel of the same name by A. B. Guthrie Jr. Filming took place in Sierra de Órganos National Park in the town of Sombrerete, Mexico.

The plot involves a sheltered rancher brought up under the stern gaze of his Bible-thumping father.

Plot

Albert Gallatin "Lat" Evans (Don Murray), an earnest young cowboy determined to better his situation, wins a job with a cattle drive by busting a wild horse. Befriended by cowhand Tom Ping (Stuart Whitman), Lat fantasizes about owning his own ranch and being rich one day, unlike his father, who died "broke, a failure." When the drive reaches a small Wyoming town, the cowboys congregate at the saloon, where Jehu (Richard Egan), an unscrupulous rancher, proposes racing one of their horses against his swift steed. Lat accepts the challenge, and is in the lead when his opponent throws a blanket at his face, causing Lat to lose his balance and fall from his horse. Marshal Conrad (Albert Dekker), the town's upstanding banker, intervenes, however, and declares Lat the winner.

That night, Tom and Lat celebrate with saloon girls Jen (Jean Willes) and Callie (Lee Remick). With their winnings, they decide to leave the cattle drive and hunt wolves for their hides. After bidding his cowhand friends goodbye, Lat, feeling melancholy, gets drunk and visits Callie. When Lat recalls a traumatic incident from his childhood in which his father beat him for being alone with a girl in the woodshed, Callie feels empathy.

Restless and impatient to become successful, Lat asks Conrad for a loan to buy a ranch. After Conrad turns him down, Callie gives Lat her life savings to buy a piece of land, which he then uses as collateral for a loan from Conrad to purchase a herd of cattle. Lat makes Tom a partner in the venture, and after a hard winter, Lat prospers while the other ranchers falter, since he grew hay in the low lands to feed to the cattle in the winter.

As his fortunes improve, Lat begins to shun Callie for Conrad's niece Joyce (Patricia Owens). When Tom tells Lat that he plans to marry Jen, Lat questions his decision and calls Jen a tramp, causing Tom to angrily renounce their partnership.

One night, while Lat is dining at Conrad's, the banker proposes that he enter politics by running for the school board. Meanwhile, Callie, who has baked a cake for Lat, anxiously awaits his arrival, and when Jehu appears instead, she fights off his crude advances. After dinner, Joyce invites Lat to call on her if he is reputable. Lat goes to Callie's house and informs her that there is no place in his life for her. Soon after, Lat and Joyce are married and start a family. Jehu and Callie become lovers.

When Lat decides to run for U.S. Senator, he is visited by Jehu and rancher Frank Chanault (Tom Greenway), who use the promise of their votes to coerce him into joining a group of rancher vigilantes on the trail of some horse thieves. The ranchers corner the thieves at their mountain hideout, and after a gun battle, the two surviving rustlers surrender, and Lat is shocked to discover that Tom is one of them. After Tom confesses, he accuses Lat of worshiping the tin god of money. Jehu sentences Tom to hang, and when Lat protests that he be allowed to stand trial, Jehu knocks him unconscious and then hangs Tom.

Riddled with remorse, Lat returns home and Joyce hands him a distress note from Callie. Although Joyce jealousy forbids Lat to see Callie, Lat contends that he owes her a debt and proceeds to her house. There, Lat learns from her servant Happy (Ken Renard) that Jehu has savagely beaten Callie. Outraged, Lat goes in search of Jehu. After finding Jehu at the saloon, the two begin to fight and their brawl spills onto the street as the townsfolk watch in consternation. Pulling a rifle from a saddle, Jehu aims it at Lat just as a gunshot fired by Callie rings out, killing Jehu. Later, at home, Joyce forgives Lat, and when he informs her that he intends to testify at Callie's trial, she graciously gives her consent.

Cast

Reception
New York Times reviewer Bosley Crowther was critical: "Under Richard Fleischer's direction, (cast members) dutifully lend their hands to this prettily garbed and scenic sermon, in which no one in Hollywood could deeply believe."

References

External links 
 
 
 
 

1959 films
1959 Western (genre) films
20th Century Fox films
CinemaScope films
American Western (genre) films
1950s English-language films
Films scored by Leigh Harline
Films directed by Richard Fleischer
Films set in Wyoming
1950s American films